The Wingate Sandstone is a geologic formation in the Glen Canyon Group of the Colorado Plateau province of the United States which crops out in northern Arizona, northwest Colorado, Nevada, and Utah.

Geology 
Wingate Sandstone is particularly prominent in southeastern Utah, where it forms attractions in a number of national parks and monuments. These include Capitol Reef National Park, the San Rafael Swell, and Canyonlands National Park.

Wingate Sandstone frequently appears just below the Kayenta Formation and Navajo Sandstone, two other formations of the Glen Canyon group. Wingate layers are typically pale orange to red in color, the remnants of wind-born sand dunes deposited approximately 200 million years ago in the Late Triassic.

Fossil content 
Long dated to the Early Jurassic only, fossils (including a phytosaur skull) and other evidence indicate that part of the Wingate Sandstone is as old as Late Triassic in age. The upper part of the formation, which laterally interfingers with the Moenave Formation to the west, is Early Jurassic in age.

Gallery

References

External links 

 U.S.G.S National Geologic Map Database Lexicon

Sandstone formations of the United States
Jurassic System of North America
Triassic System of North America
Jurassic Arizona
Triassic Arizona
Jurassic Colorado
Triassic Colorado
Jurassic geology of Nevada
Triassic geology of Nevada
Jurassic geology of Utah
Triassic geology of Utah
Geologic formations with imbedded sand dunes
Aeolian deposits